The Matter of Critique: Readings in Kant's Philosophy is a 2000 book edited by Andrea Rehberg and Rachel Ellen Jones.
It is a collection of essays offering an account of Kantian thought from the Continental perspective as developed by such thinkers as Martin Heidegger, Jacques Derrida, Luce Irigaray, Gilles Deleuze and Jean-François Lyotard. The book has been reviewed by Frank Schalow and Kimberly Hutchings.

Contributors
 Martin Bell
 Michael Bowles
 Howard Caygill
 Paul Davies
 Iain Hamilton Grant
 Joanna Hodge
 Kath Renark Jones
 Rachel Jones
 Simon Malpas
 Andrea Rehberg
 Jim Urpeth
 Alistair Welchman

References

External links 
 The Matter of Critique: Readings in Kant's Philosophy

2000 non-fiction books
Books about Immanuel Kant
Continental philosophy literature
Edited volumes